Buddha of Medicine Welfare Society, is a Buddhist monastery in Singapore. The society was originally set up by Venerable Neng Du. The present premises are located at Geylang, Singapore.

Overview
Buddha of Medicine Welfare Society was initiated in 1991 and approved as a non-profit in Singapore in June 1995. The current resident teacher as of 2013 is Venerable Neng Du. Politician Lee Bee Wah was appointed as the honorary advisor of the monastery in the 2010s.

See also
Buddhism in Singapore

References

Buddhist organisations based in Singapore
Mahayana Buddhist organizations
Buddhist temples in Singapore
Non-profit organisations based in Singapore
Geylang